Marius Nizolius (1498–1576) was an Italian humanist scholar, known as a proponent of Cicero. He considered rhetoric to be the central intellectual discipline, slighting other aspects of the philosophical tradition. He is described by Michael R. Allen as the heir to the oratorical vision of Lorenzo Valla, and a better nominalist.

Life

He was born in Brescello. He was professor of philosophy at Parma and Sabbioneta.

Works

His major work was the Thesaurus Ciceronianus, first published in 1535 in Brixen but not under this title, and running into many further editions. It was a lexicon of Latin words used in Cicero's works. It was adopted by Renaissance extremists who considered that writing in Latin could only be correct within this restricted vocabulary. His Antibarbarus philosophicus (original title De veris principiis et vera ratione philosophandi contra psudophilosophos, Parma, 1553) was edited by Leibniz in 1670 with an important Preface. It was a reply in a controversy with Marco Antonio Maioragio (1514-1555), and going back to a dispute from the mid-1540s over the Paradoxes of Cicero.

He died in Sabbioneta.

Notes

External links
Ignacio Angelelli, Nizolius' notion of class (multitudo) (PDF), in Anales de la Academia Nacional de Ciencias de Buenos Aires, XXXV(2), 2001, 575-595.
 Nizolius, Marius (1498-1566)

1498 births
1576 deaths
Linguists from Italy
Italian Renaissance humanists